Army General Valentin Vladimirovich Korabelnikov (born January 4, 1946, in Tambov Oblast, Soviet Union) is a Russian general, best known for being the longest serving director of the GRU for nearly 12 years.

Korabelnikov attended the Minsk Higher Engineering Anti-Aircraft Rocket School of Air Defense, from which he graduated in 1969, and subsequently graduated from the M. V. Frunze Military Academy in 1974 and the General Staff Academy in 1988.

In May 1997, Korabelnikov was appointed Chief of the Main Intelligence Directorate (GRU) of the Russian General Staff, Russia's largest intelligence agency. Korabelnikov worked his way up the GRU hierarchy for 20 years before becoming the Intelligence Directorate's head. Korabelnikov spent time alongside Spetsnaz brigades in Chechnya, while he was reportedly responsible for the operation which resulted in the elimination of Chechen President Dzhokhar Dudayev in 1996. Korabelnikov often involved himself personally in operational work, and was reportedly wounded by Chechen fighters.

In July 1999, Korabelnikov received an official acknowledgment from president Boris Yeltsin for his "significant contribution to the settlement of the Kosovo Conflict". He was a member of Russian delegation, led by Prime Minister Yevgeny Primakov that met with Slobodan Milosevic during the NATO bombing of Yugoslavia.

On 24 April 2009, President Dmitry Medvedev signed a decree dismissing Korabelnikov from his position as head of the GRU's Intelligence Directorate, replacing him with Gen Alexander Shlyakhturov. No reason was given the decision, however Korabelnikov had reportedly tendered his resignation earlier in 2009 due to disagreement over military reforms.

References

External links
Smart and well trained people work with US His interview
President Putin visits new GRU headquarters
Another interview (Russian)
His biography (Russian)

Russian politicians
GRU Chiefs
Soviet generals
People of the Chechen wars
Living people
1946 births
Frunze Military Academy alumni
Military Academy of the General Staff of the Armed Forces of the Soviet Union alumni
Heroes of the Russian Federation
Generals of the army (Russia)